Nanshiang was a railway station on the Taiwan Railways Administration Linkou line located in Guishan District, Taoyuan City, Taiwan.

History
The station was opened on 28 November 2005 but was then closed on 28 December 2012.

Nearby stations
Taiwan Railways Administration
  <-- Linkou line -->

See also
List of railway stations in Taiwan

2005 establishments in Taiwan
2012 disestablishments in Taiwan
Defunct railway stations in Taiwan
Railway stations opened in 2005
Railway stations closed in 2012